Ludwig Mayer may refer to:

 Ludwig Mayer (bookseller)
 Ludwig Mayer (skier)

See also
 Ludwig & Mayer, a German type foundry